UiTM Faculty of Civil Engineering is one of the professional graduate faculty of UiTM located in Shah Alam, Malaysia.

The Dean in office is Professor Dr. Azmi Ibrahim, who assumed the role in 2010.
Currently, the faculty consists of 89 academic staff, 24 admin and 40 technical staff. It has about 501 postgraduate students and 1190 undergraduate.

Historical background

The Faculty of Civil Engineering for Universiti Teknologi MARA Malaysia was established in 1967. It started by providing courses in Civil Engineering at the Diploma level for Institiut Teknologi MARA. Students who have completed the Diploma were given options to continue their studies to obtain a Higher National Diploma.
When ITM is granted a full university status, all diplomas issued by ITM have been upgraded to an undergraduate degree. The faculty starts offering undergraduate and post-graduate courses in (year).

Centre of Studies

Structural and Material Engineering Division(STRUCM) 
The latest evolution of Faculty of Civil Engineering is the formation of the Division of Structures and Materials in July 2009.

Water Resources and Environmental System Division(WRES) 

The division is responsible towards teaching undergraduate courses such as Fluid Mechanics, Hydraulics, Hydrology, Water Supply, Wastewater Engineering, Groundwater, Hydraulics Structures, and Coastal Engineering. Among the courses offered in the master's degree program are Environmental Management, Water Resources Planning and Management, Flood Management and Mitigation, Advanced Water Supply, Solid Waste Management, Erosion and Sedimentation, Groundwater Engineering, Computational Fluid Dynamic, Hazardous and Industrial Waste, Risk and Hazard Assessment, Environmental Management of Coastal Areas, and Air Pollution.

Research projects undertaken by the researchers of the division include anoxic process in sewer, anoxic and anaerobic process of leacheate treatment, biodegradation of polycyclic aromatic hydrocarbons (PAHs), bioadsorption of heavy metal using fungi, membrane technology, river sediment modelling, flood modelling and simulation, hydro-meteorological flood forecasting, remote sensing techniques using radar and geostationary meteorological satellite in quantitative precipitation forecast, intelligent flood warning system and inundation model, river pollution, groundwater contaminant modelling and remediation optimisation, statistical analysis of hydrologic processes, water supply systems management, non-revenue water analysis, water quality planning, risk analysis, river basin management, systems planning and operation, ecological systems management, sustainable development, and computer graphics-oriented decision support systems.

The Flood-Marine Excellence Centre has been established by Prof. Ir. Dr. Junaidah Ariffin. Members of the centre includes Assoc. Prof. Dr. Wardah Tahir, Dr Mohd Fozi Ali and from different disciplines such as Assoc. Prof. Dr. Azlinah Mohamed and Assoc. Prof. Zaidah Ibrahim. The aim of establishing this centre is to promote research in the field of hydrology, hydraulics and coastal engineering. The members affiliated to this research centre had secured grants worth a million Malaysian ringgit of which six (6) research are still on-going. The research areas include water resources development, evaluation techniques of channel stability and erosion control, local bed changes of restoration areas, channel distributaries, hydraulic structures such as sills, small dams, weirs and water intakes, flood forecasting, evacuation scenarios, flood hazard reduction and flood protection, the application of numerical methods in water resources and sedimentation, flood analysis, prediction, forecasting and warning, risk and management.  The other activities of the centre are organising workshop, seminar, training and conference in promoting knowledge in the area.  The centre is aggressively pursuing opportunities to work with other institutions, public and private sectors (both local and abroad) on issues related to flood analysis, management and coastal engineering. This centre has published more than 250 publications including 65 in refereed journals.  Currently, there are ten (10) students pursuing their postgraduate degree by research working under the supervision of this centre.

Geotechnical Highway Engineering Division(GEOTREN) 
GeoTrEn spearheads two important areas in civil engineering; namely; geotechnical engineering, and transportation engineering. For bachelor's degree programmes, there are seven (7) courses offered as well as courses from other centers, such as Engineering Geology, Engineering Survey, Geotechnical Laboratory, Soil Mechanics, Geotechniques, GIS for Engineers, Highway and Traffic Engineering. There are four (4) courses offered as an elective course, namely Foundation Engineering, Geotechnical Engineering, Urban Traffic Management and Pavement Engineering. These courses are designed to provide good engineering practice to young graduates in the related fields.
 
In addition, two master's degree programmes (by coursework) are offered under this center, which are MSc in Geotechiques and MSc in Highway Engineering, emphasise given to the specialised courses in the respective field. Besides, postgraduate research programmes (MSc and PhD) are also offered in specific areas such as advanced saturated and unsaturated soil mechanics, numerical modelling, soil stabilisation, tropical rock engineering, site investigation and geophysics. While for transportation engineering the interest fields include pavement engineering, traffic, road safety engineering and urban transportation.
 
Based on the expertise of the lecturers at the center, three research centers have been established under the Institute for Infrastructures Engineering and Sustainable Management (IIESM) namely myGERMeG, GeoFORENSIC and TRANSIT. Under myGERMeG research center, the members are actively involved in research, consultation and act as expert advisory group addressing geotechnical design and development in the areas of tropical rock engineering, soil and rock testing, and soft soil stabilisation. Meanwhile, members of GeoFORENSIC research center address geotechnical problems related to tropical climate, especially on residual soil and soft marine clays i.e. landslide, soil erosion, ground settlement of highways and construction embankments on marine clay, karstic limestone and sinkholes, collapse of excavation during deep constructions and tunnelling. TRANSIT research center focuses on transportation systems, infrastructure and intelligent transport which involve planning, design, construction, maintenance, and operation of transportation facilities and infrastructure.

Campuses
Campus Selangor – Shah Alam – main campus – postgraduate and undergraduate 
Campus Pulau Pinang – Permatang Pauh – undergraduate
Campus Pahang – Jengka- undergraduate
Campus Sarawak – Kota Samarahan – undergraduate
Campus Johor – Pasir Gudang – undergraduate

Former Dean
Dato' Hashim Salleh – Head of School Engineering – 11 March 1968 – 31 December 1972
Ir. Toh Weng Fook – Head of School Engineering – 1 January 1973 – 30 June 1976
Syed Abdul Kadir Al-Junid – Head of School Engineering – 1 July 1976 – 30 September 1979
Dr. Mohd Nawi Salleh – Head of School Engineering – 1 October 1979 – 14 March 1983 
Dato Hj. Mohamed Dahalan Mohamed Ramli – Head of School Engineering – 15 March 1983 – 1 April 1984
Abdullah Suhaimi Mohamed – Head of School Engineering – 1 May 1984 – 30 April 1988
Prof. Ir. Haron Ismail – Head of School Engineering – 1 May 1988 – 31 July 1991
Dr. Hasan Ibrahim – Head of School Engineering – 1 August 1991 – 31 July 1993 
Sr. Mohd Khalid Mohd Omar – Head of School Engineering – 1 August 1993 – 31 July 1995
Dato' Prof Madya Ir. Hj. Mohd Salleh Mohd Noh – Dean – 1 August 1996 – 14 January 2002
Tan Sri Dato' Sri Professor Ir. Dr. Hj. Sahol Hamid Abu Bakar – Dean – 15 January 2002 – 16 August 2002
Prof. Ir. Dr. Hj. Mohd Yusof Abdul Rahman – Dean – 23 August 2002 – 31 May 2006
Prof. Ir. Dr. Hjh. Zainab Mohamed – Dean – 1 June 2006 – 30 September 2010

Alumni
Since its establishment in 1967, the Faculty of Civil Engineering has graduated more than 20,000 graduates.

References

Universiti Teknologi MARA
Engineering universities and colleges in Malaysia
Universities and colleges in Selangor
Educational institutions established in 1967
1967 establishments in Malaysia